The Malaysian Communications and Multimedia Commission (Abbreviation: MCMC) is a regulatory body whose key role is the regulation of the communications and multimedia industry based on the powers provided for in the Malaysian Communications and Multimedia Commission Act 1998, the Communications and Multimedia Act 1998, and the Strategic Trade Act 2010. MCMC is similar to the National Telecommunications Commission (NTC) in the Philippines. Its role to implement and promote the Government's national policy objectives for the communications and multimedia sector. MCMC is also charged with overseeing the new regulatory framework for the converging telecommunications and broadcasting industries and online activities. In 2001, MCMC's role was expanded to include overseeing the postal service sector pursuant to the Postal Services Act 1991 and licensing of the Certification Authorities under the Digital Signature Act 1997.

Vision & Mission
Vision 

Establishing a communications and multimedia industry that is competitive, efficient and increasingly self-regulating, generating growth to meet the economic and social needs of Malaysia.

Mission

MCMC is committed to :

 Promoting access to communications and multimedia services;
 Ensuring consumers enjoy choice and a satisfactory level of     services at affordable prices;
 Providing transparent regulatory processes to facilitate fair     competition and efficiency in the industry;
 Ensuring best use of spectrum and number resources; and
 Consulting regularly with consumers and service providers and facilitating industry collaboration.

Commission Members
Chairman

Dr. Fadhlullah Suhaimi Abdul Malek  ( effective 10 June 2020 )

Commission Members (Governmental)

YBhg. Dato’ Sri Haji Mohammad bin Mentek

YBhg. Datuk Zainal Abidin bin Abu Hassan

Commission Members (Non-governmental)

YBhg. Tan Sri Datuk Dr. Abdul Samad Haji Alias

YBhg. Datuk Seri Tajuddin Atan

YBrs. Prof Dr Tharek Abd Rahman

YBrs. Mr. Chew Liong Kim

YBrs. Dr. Zaidi Razak

Programmes & Initiatives
 Moratorium on New Licensing of Courier Services: A two-year moratorium on the issuance of courier service licences will help ease industry-overcrowding until September 2022. MCMC’s moratorium takes effect from Sept 14, 2020 until Sept 15, 2022. A new action plan via the National Postal and Courier Industry Laboratory (NPCIL) is in the works to support strategic development aspirations of the new postal and courier industry, and will be reported on and published at the end of November.
PIK Transformation: MCMC empowers 1,064 community Internet centres nationwide to become digital transformation centres for local communities, especially for the younger demographic.  Basic, as well as advanced, training sessions on information technology and communications (ICT), were provided.  Amongst covered areas are programming, robotic applications, mobile application innovation, e-commerce entrepreneurship, animation, video production, 3D printing and other forms of training which could benefit the youngsters to learn, innovate and improve.
WSIS Prizes 2020 for ‘Klik Dengan Bijak’: MCMC was announced as the Project Champion through the "Klik Dengan Bijak" project for the 'Ethical Dimensions of the Information Society’ category. The winning category was among 17 others that were competed in the Forum World Summit on the Information Society Prizes (WSIS) 2020 which took place in Geneva, Switzerland.
Jalinan Digital Negara (JENDELA):  Jalinan Digital Negara (JENDELA) is a digital infrastructure plan to meet the needs of digital connectivity and to help prepare the nation for a gradual transition to 5G technology and will also lay the foundation for comprehensive and high-quality broadband coverage facilities.  Sabahans would benefit from the implementation of JENDELA from 2020 to 2022, through a planned addition of 382 new communication towers and the upgrading of 924 existing communication transmitters under the Universal Service Provision (USP) programme.
MCMC and MyCC Jointly Address Exclusivity Arrangements In High-Rise Buildings: MCMC and the Malaysia Competition Commission (MyCC) collaborated in addressing exclusivity arrangements between telecommunications service providers and property developers or building management companies in high-rise buildings and residential complexes, following several complaints by the public.  "Garis Panduan Perancangan Infrastruktur Komunikasi, (GPP-I)’’ was published to facilitate the planning and development of communications infrastructure in new property developments which resulted in long-term benefits for end users, who can choose service providers based on prices or quality of service.
MCMC Handles 99.83% First Half of the Year Complaints: 99.83% of the 11,235 complaints related to cybercrimes were resolved in the first half of 2020.   18% of complaints were referred to social media platform providers for further action to be taken, while the remaining 1.27% or 143 complaints, were found to have violated provisions under Section 233 of the Communications and Multimedia Act 1998.
The People-Centric Economic Stimulus Package (PRIHATIN): Announced by Prime Minister of Malaysia, Tan Sri Muhyiddin Yassin on 27 March 2020, the PRIHATIN package is the biggest economic stimulus package in the history of the nation.  Several packages in collaboration with various telecommunications companies (telcos), estimated at RM 1 billion, and include efforts to improve telecommunications network and free Internet subscriptions, were offered.
Sebenarnya.my Official Telegram Account: An official Telegram channel for the Sebenarnya.my portal was created to enhance the efforts to tackle the spread of fake news on social media including the COVID-19 pandemic.
Distribution of myFreeview Decoders for Eligible B40 and PWDs: MCMC announced that registered B40 households and people with disabilities (PWD) nationwide are eligible to myFreeview decoders. A total of 3,000 myFreeview decoders were distributed in Sabah from 20-22 February 2020.  The additional allocation of free decoders was an effort by the government to bridge the digital divide and to uplift the underprivileged groups across the country.
5GDP Malaysia Launch in Langkawi: A collaboration with Telekom Malaysia Bhd (TM) and Digi Telecommunications Sdn Bhd (Digi) in testing the capabilities, possibilities and limitations of 5G network sharing between multiple network-service operators during the 5GDP period and has portrayed synergy between fixed and mobile network operators in delivering 5G connectivity solutions.
National Digital ID Framework: The National Digital ID initiative is aimed at advancing Malaysia into the cyber age. It is an advanced method of authenticating a user’s identity online, where it is safe, secure and protected.   It will not be replacing MyKad as proof of citizenship but rather complement it as a form of identification when transacting digitally and is also a critical step in society’s migration to the digital realm and must be implemented through a Rakyat-centric framework.

Notes

See also 
 Digital Nasional Berhad (DNB)

References

External links
 
Official website (Malay)

Federal ministries, departments and agencies of Malaysia
Government agencies established in 1998
1998 establishments in Malaysia
Ministry of Communications and Multimedia (Malaysia)
Communications authorities
Regulation in Malaysia
Internet in Malaysia